This article is about music-related events in 1838.

Events 
March 7 – Jenny Lind, the "Swedish Nightingale", debuts at the Stockholm Opera
November 8 – The ailing Polish-born composer and pianist Frédéric Chopin begins an uncomfortable (but compositionally productive) winter living with his lover, French novelist George Sand, on the Mediterranean island of Majorca in the abandoned Carthusian monastery of Valldemossa. Here he writes his 24 Preludes (Op. 28).
Giovanni Ricordi buys Giuseppe Verdi's copyrights.

Popular music 
 "Annie Laurie", words (1688) William Douglas, music Lady John Scott (Alicia Ann Spottiswoode)
 "'Tis Home Where'er the Heart Is" – words by Robert Dale Owen, music by John Hill Hewitt
 "A Life on the Ocean Wave" - words by Epes Sargent, music by Henry Russell

Classical music 
William Sterndale Bennett – Piano Concerto No. 4, Op. 19 
Johanna Kinkel – Das Schloss Boncort, Op.9 (published under J. Mathieux)
Franz Lachner – Frauenliebe und -leben
Franz Liszt 
'Études d'exécution transcendante d'après Paganini'
Grand galop chromatique
Carl Loewe – 4 Fabellieder, Op.64
Felix Mendelssohn – String Quartets Op. 44, No. 3 in D Major and No. 5 in E-Flat Major
Robert Schumann
Kinderszenen, Op. 15
Kreisleriana, Op. 16
Louis Spohr 
String Quintet No.5, Op.106
3 Duette pour deux soparano & piano, Op.108

Opera 
Hector Berlioz – Benvenuto Cellini
Albert Grisar – Lady Melvil
Louis Spohr – Der Matrose

Births 
January 6 – Max Bruch, German composer (died 1920)
March 21 – Wilma Neruda, Moravian-born violinist (died 1911)
July 9 – Philip Bliss, American Gospel composer (died 1876)
October 25 – Georges Bizet, French composer (died 1875)

Deaths 
January 13 – Ferdinand Ries, composer and pianist (born 1784)
March 2 – Ludwig Abeille, composer (born 1761)
March 24 – Thomas Attwood, organist and composer (b. 1765)
April 29 – Joseph von Henikstein, patron of the arts and friend of Mozart (b. 1768)
May 28 – Thomas Busby, English composer (b. 1755)
July 28 – Bernhard Henrik Crusell, clarinet player and composer (b. 1775)
August 17 – Lorenzo Da Ponte, librettist
August 21 – Adelbert von Chamisso, lyricist (born 1781)
December 26 – Franciszek Lessel, composer (born 1780)

References

 
19th century in music
Music by year